Lasiommata is a genus of butterflies of the subfamily Satyrinae in the family Nymphalidae.

Species
 Lasiommata megera (Linnaeus, 1767)
 Lasiommata adrastoides (Bienert, [1870])
 Lasiommata felix (Warnecke, 1929)
 Lasiommata hefengana Chou & Zhang, 1994
 Lasiommata hindukushica (Wyatt & Omoto, 1966)
 Lasiommata kasumi Yoshino, 1995
 Lasiommata maderakal (Guérin-Méneville, 1849)
 Lasiommata meadewaldoi (Rothschild, 1917)
 Lasiommata maera (Linnaeus, 1758)
 Lasiommata maerula C. & R. Felder, [1867] Himalayas, Kashmir
 Lasiommata majuscula (Leech, [1892]) China
 Lasiommata menava Moore, 1865
 Lasiommata minuscula (Oberthür, 1923) China
 Lasiommata paramegaera (Hübner, 1824)
 Lasiommata petropolitana (Fabricius, 1787)
 Lasiommata schakra (Kollar, [1844])

External links
Satyrinae of the Western Palearctic

Gallery

References

 
Satyrini
Butterfly genera
Taxa named by John O. Westwood